Surjani Town is one of the neighborhoods of Gadap Town in Karachi, Sindh, Pakistan. It is a low cost area.

Location 
Surjani Town is on the Left of New Karachi. Surjani Town is at last of North Karachi. Khuda ki Basti, Taiser Town, and Liyari, also knowns as a part of Surjani Town. Surjani town start after 4k Chowrangi.

Demography 
Muhajirs are the majority in Surjani town. There are also several minority ethnic groups in Surjani Town including Sindhis, Kashmiris, Saraikis, Pakhtuns, Balochis, Memons, Bohras, Ismailis, Baltis, etc. Over 99% of the population is Muslim. The population of Gadap Town is estimated to be nearly 2.5 million.

Flooding in 2020 
The area of Surjani had been flooded by the heavy rains, with rainwater submerging houses up to five feet and more, resulting in the suspension of electricity supply and destroying its residents' belongings. Yousuf Goth effected in Surjani 2020. Almost 10 Feet of Water in this area. Many People after this flooding leave their houses, and Many Organizations like Dawat e Islami help those people. They were distributing Food & Water and building the homes of those people. Yousuf Goth have more than 3 Lac population. Yaro Khan Goth is in neighbourhood.

References

Neighbourhoods of Karachi